Yu Qiangsheng (1940–1990s?) was a high-ranking intelligence official of the People's Republic of China who defected to the United States in 1985. The information he provided led to the arrest and suicide of the top Chinese spy Larry Wu-Tai Chin. He was a son of Communist revolutionaries Huang Jing (Yu Qiwei) and Fan Jin, and the elder brother of Yu Zhengsheng, the fourth highest-ranking leader of the Chinese Communist Party since November 2012.

Biography
Yu was born in 1940. He had four siblings, including younger brother Yu Zhengsheng.

He graduated from University of International Relations in Beijing. He was a son of Communist revolutionaries Huang Jing (born Yu Qiwei) and Fan Jin. 

Just before the Cultural Revolution, Yu Qiangsheng began his career as a detective in the Beijing Public Security Bureau. While working as director of the Ministry of State Security, Yu defected to the United States in 1985. He exposed the top Chinese spy Larry Wu-Tai Chin, a retired CIA analyst, who was charged with espionage and committed suicide in prison, as well as Bernard Boursicot, a French diplomat who had been recruited via a honeypot trap.

Yu Qiangsheng disappeared in the 1990s. It has been reported that he was assassinated in Latin America.

Yu's defection did not scuttle the career of his brother Yu Zhengsheng, who became the Communist Party Chief of Hubei province, Shanghai municipality, and a member of the Politburo Standing Committee of the Chinese Communist Party in November 2012.

References 

1940 births
Chinese spies
Defectors to the United States
Chinese defectors
Possibly living people
Chinese police officers
People from Shaoxing